Gilvan Souza Correa (born 10 November 1989), simply known as Gilvan, is a Brazilian footballer who plays as a central defender for CRB.

Club career
Born in Salgado, Gilvan made his professional debut with fourth tier Iraty Sport Club in 2010, before moving to Londrina Esporte Clube of the same tier two years later. On 19 May 2014, he signed for Associação Atlética Ponte Preta of the second tier on a loan deal.

After having ended the season winning promotion to the first tier, Gilvan chose to stay back in the second, and signed a one-year loan deal with Ceará Sporting Club on 9 January 2015. He made his league debut in May, playing the whole ninety minutes of a 1–0 defeat against Paraná Clube.

On 6 January 2016, Gilvan moved to Paysandu Sport Club on a year long loan deal. He scored a brace for the club on 20 August, in a 2–0 league victory against his former club Ceará. He won the 2016 season of the Copa Verde with the club. On 5 July 2017, he was released by the club due to a clause in his contract - he had to be released if he received any offer from a Série A club. He subsequently signed with Atlético Goianiense. Though the club was relegated at the season, he signed a one-year contract extension in December.

On 13 January 2018, Gilvan moved abroad for the first time and signed a three-year deal with Romanian Liga I club CFR Cluj. He returned to Atlético Goianiense in July 2018 without making an appearance for the Romanian club.

Honours

Botafogo
 Campeonato Brasileiro Série B: 2021

CFR Cluj
Liga I: 2017–18

Ceará
Copa do Nordeste: 2015

References

External links
 
 

1989 births
Living people
Brazilian footballers
Association football defenders
Campeonato Brasileiro Série A players
Campeonato Brasileiro Série B players
Campeonato Brasileiro Série D players
Iraty Sport Club players
Londrina Esporte Clube players
Associação Atlética Ponte Preta players
Ceará Sporting Club players
Paysandu Sport Club players
Atlético Clube Goianiense players
CFR Cluj players
Botafogo de Futebol e Regatas players
Clube de Regatas Brasil players
Brazilian expatriate footballers
Brazilian expatriate sportspeople in Romania
Expatriate footballers in Romania